John M. Dwyer (August 25, 1935 – September 15, 2018) was an American set decorator. He was nominated for an Academy Award in the category Best Art Direction for the film Coal Miner's Daughter, and won an Emmy Award in 1981 for The Gangster Chronicles. He worked on nearly 70 films and television shows from 1966 to 2004.

Selected filmography
 Star Trek (1967-1969) (nominated for Emmy Award with Matt Jeffries)
 Jaws (1975)
 Coal Miner's Daughter (1980) (nominated for Academy Award with John W. Corso)
 Thief (1981)
 The Thing (1982)
 Star Trek IV: The Voyage Home (1986)
 Star Trek: The Next Generation (1987-88)
 Star Trek V: The Final Frontier (1989)
 Black Rain (1989)
 Star Trek Generations (1994)
 Star Trek: First Contact (1996)
 Star Trek: Insurrection (1998)
 Star Trek: Nemesis (2002)

References

External links

1935 births
2018 deaths
American set decorators
Artists from Detroit
Emmy Award winners